Oceanhorn 2: Knights of the Lost Realm is an open-world action-adventure video game developed by Finnish studio Cornfox & Bros. It was released as an Apple Arcade exclusive on September 19, 2019. It is the prequel of the 2013 game Oceanhorn: Monster of Uncharted Seas and takes place a millennium before the events of the game. A port for Nintendo Switch of Oceanhorn 2 was released on October 28, 2020. A version for next-gen consoles and PC was announced, to be published in partnership with FDG Entertainment.

The gameplay and graphic design of Oceanhorn 2 closely follows that of The Legend of Zelda video games, with the gameplay taking after the long line of linear games from the history of the saga and the art style bearing a close resemblance to Breath of the Wild.

Story

On a stormy night, Master Mayfair is given a child by the demon Mesmeroth, in request of being in good care.

Years later, ‘Hero’ (who we later find out is named "Theo"), now an adult, arrives at Outcast Island to retrieve a lockbox which is necessary to be a knight. Back to his town, Theo continues his training with the help of his robot friend Gen; he later meets Trin, when he goes investigate her crashed airship and takes her back to his village. There, Dark Troopers invades the village to find Trin as she knows secret information.

Theo, Trin, Mayfair and Gen escape to White City where they learn that Mesmeroth is planning to steal the throne and rule over the kingdom. To prevent this, Theo and his comrades start their journey to find the three Sacred Emblems of Sun, Earth and Ocean. 
At the Great Forest of Pirta, Hero kills Chora Tuyk, and receives the Emblem of Earth; they later travel to Submeria, where they kill Yurmala, a gigantic demon turtle, and they retrieve the Emblem of Ocean.

On their way back to the White City, Mesmeroth and his Dark Troopers attack Submeria with airships and an armada. To defend herself, Trin awakens the Oceanhorn, a powerful robot monster. Theo, Gen and Master Mayfair infiltrate the command ship of the armada. Upon reaching the command center of the ship, Mesmeroth reveals that Gen is his dark servant and teleports away. Theo, Trin and Master Mayfair return to the White City. Archimedes, the leader of Arcadia, asks them to find and return the Emblem of Sun in order to finish his project to save Arcadia. Theo confronts Mesmeroth and receives the Emblem of Sun, but Mesmeroth escaped and continues his plan to destroy the White City using a dark power knows as Triloth. The knights then leave back to White City, where Oceanhorn (now under Mesmeroth's control) and the other Living Fortresses appear and destroy the city.
While Master Mayfair escaped with all the arcadians to a safe place, Theo confronts Oceanhorn and escaped with Trin, however, Oceanhorn survived.

After the credits, it is revealed that Theo never got the Emblem of Sun, which is now lost.

Reception

Oceanhorn 2 received mixed or average reviews. It has been described shortly after launch as one of Apple Arcade's "killer exclusives".

References

External links

2019 video games
Action role-playing video games
Action-adventure games
Apple Arcade games
Nintendo Switch games
IOS games
Open-world video games
Single-player video games
Unreal Engine games
Video games developed in Finland
Video game prequels